Traostalos is the archaeological site of a Minoan peak sanctuary in eastern Crete.

Archaeology
Traostalos was first excavated in 1963-1964 under Kostis Davaras.  Davaras returned in 1978 to continue that work.  A rescue excavation from April to October 1995 was led by Stella Chryssoulaki.

Along with the usual clay human and animal figurines common to peak sanctuaries, Traostalos has, notably, a female figure with a swollen leg.  Other finds at Traostalos include ceramic boats and stone altars.  See references for a more complete inventory.

References

Bibliography
 Jones, Donald W. 1999 Peak Sanctuaries and Sacred Caves in Minoan Crete 
 Chryssoulaki, Stella The Traostalos Peak Sanctuary: Aspects of Spatial Organization Retrieved 19 January 2006

External links

Peak sanctuaries